Scott Fox (born December 28, 1963 in Knoxville, Tennessee died June 16, 2015 Nashville, Tennessee) was a professional American football linebacker in the National Football League. He was a replacement player for the Houston Oilers during the players strike in the 1987 NFL season. He played football at Clinton Senior High School in Clinton, Tennessee, graduating in 1981.  He played college football at Austin Peay State. He was 6'2" and weighed 222 lbs. in his playing time.

External links
NFL.com player page
player stats
Obituary

References

1963 births
Living people
People from Knoxville, Tennessee
American football linebackers
Houston Oilers players
National Football League replacement players